E30 may refer to:

Automobiles
 Fengshen E30, a 2016–present Chinese electric city car
 Venucia e30, two different Chinese electric cars
 Zotye E30, a 2016–present Chinese electric city car
 BMW 3 Series (E30), a 1982–1994 German compact executive car
 Toyota Corolla (E30), a 1974–1981 Japanese compact car

Roads
 E 30 road (United Arab Emirates)
 European route E30
 New North Klang Straits Bypass, route E30 in Malaysia
 Seto-Chūō Expressway, route E30 in Japan

Other uses
 Nimzo-Indian Defense, Encyclopaedia of Chess Openings code
 HMS E30, a British submarine